The North Shore is part of the large urban area of Auckland, New Zealand, located to the north of the Waitematā Harbour. To the east, has the Hauraki Gulf, to the west, is West Auckland, to the south, has the Waitematā Harbour and Central Auckland, to the north has the Hibiscus Coast. From 1989 until 2010, North Shore City was an independent city within the Auckland Region, until it was incorporated into the Auckland Council.

North Shore City
The North Shore was formerly North Shore City, a distinct territorial authority district, which was governed by the North Shore City Council from 1989 until 2010, when it was incorporated into Auckland Council. The city had an estimated population of 229,000  at 30 June 2010, making it the fourth most populous city in New Zealand prior to the November 2010 reorganisation. The former city was also the country's fourth largest city in land, with an area of 129.81 square kilometres and a coastline of 141 kilometres. It was also the most densely populated city in the country because unlike many other New Zealand cities, almost all of the city's area was urban or suburban, with almost no rural land.

Geography

The North Shore comprises a large suburban area to the north of downtown Auckland; linked to the rest of the greater Auckland metropolitan area by two harbour bridges – the Auckland Harbour Bridge crosses the inner Waitematā Harbour to the Auckland isthmus and Auckland CBD, while the Upper Harbour Bridge on State Highway 18, provides a connection to West Auckland, across the northern stretches of the harbour.

The North Shore has been administered by various councils over the years, in the most recent past the North Shore City Council. On 1 November 2010, North Shore City Council and the six other local councils and Auckland Regional Council merged to create Auckland Council.

Today, the entire area has been divided among four local boards of the amalgamated Auckland Council: Devonport-Takapuna, Kaipatiki, Upper Harbour (along with part of the former Waitakere City) and Hibiscus and Bays (along with part of the former Rodney District).

Suburbs
The administrative area of North Shore City Council was bounded by Rodney District to the north, Waitematā Harbour to the south and the Rangitoto Channel of the Hauraki Gulf to the east. The seat of the council was in Takapuna. North Shore City was divided into the following wards, which each ward was further divided into two community boards.

Northern Ward
 Albany Community Board: Albany2, Albany Heights, Fairview Heights, Greenhithe2, Lucas Heights, Oteha, Paremoremo, Pinehill, Rosedale, Schnapper Rock, Unsworth Heights, Windsor Park; North Harbour
 East Coast Bays Community Board: Browns Bay3, Long Bay3, Mairangi Bay3, Murrays Bay3, Northcross, Okura, Rothesay Bay3, Torbay3, Waiake3

Harbour Ward
 Birkenhead-Northcote Community Board: Beach Haven2, Birkdale2, Birkenhead1, Chatswood, Northcote1, Northcote Point; Highbury
 Glenfield Community Board: Bayview, Glenfield1, Hillcrest1, Wairau Valley1

Central Ward
 Devonport Community Board: Bayswater1, Belmont1, Devonport1, Narrow Neck, Stanley Bay; Westlake
 Takapuna Community Board: Campbells Bay3, Castor Bay2, Forrest Hill1, Hauraki, Milford1, Sunnynook2, Takapuna1

Notes:

1 – Inner suburbs
2 – Outer suburbs
3 – Those suburbs, along with several other beaches on the Hauraki Gulf coast, are collectively known as the East Coast Bays.

History

To Tāmaki Māori, the North Shore was known by the name Te Whenua Roa o Kahu ("The Greater Lands of Kahu"), referring to Te Arawa chief Kahumatamomoe.

The European history of the North Shore was initially dominated by rural settlement, with people from the "main" Auckland generally venturing there only during weekends or holidays, when the beaches and many coastal settlements were favourite daytripper goals reached by the ferries connecting the North Shore to Auckland. By the 1950s, only about 50,000 people lived on the Shore, and its growth rate was still about half that of the areas south of the Waitematā, partly because few jobs were on offer.

This changed significantly with the construction of the Auckland Harbour Bridge in 1959, which opened up the Shore for Auckland expansion – vehicle volumes on the bridge became three times the forecast volume within the first decade – and began turning parts of it into a dormitory town for people working in the Auckland CBD or further south. Eventually the growth became significant enough for the North Shore to be considered a city in its own right, though densities remained (and remain as of the 2000s) still below what is typical south of the Harbour.

On 1 November 2010 the North Shore boundaries were amalgamated with the rest of the entire Auckland Region, and the North Shore City Council was abolished and replaced by a single unitary city authority. All council services and facilities are now under authority of the Auckland Council.

Transport

Commuting within the North Shore itself can be done relatively easily, but those who commute to the Auckland CBD and need to cross the Auckland Harbour Bridge face severe traffic congestion. The alternative route through western suburbs is also prone to nose-to-tail traffic at peak times. As with the greater Auckland area, there has been much discussion regarding the problem at both national and local government levels, but very little concrete action, mostly related to the high cost and difficulty of providing additional crossings over the Waitematā Harbour. Several options for new bridges and tunnels have been studied in depth, but at the moment, the official position is to mitigate congestion effects instead of providing new infrastructure. In May 2021, the government announced a $685 million dollar cycling/walking bridge that would cross the Waitematā Harbour, after a bike protest shut down two lanes of the Auckland Harbour Bridge. However, just four months later in October, the government decided to scrap the project.

The Northern Busway running alongside the Northern Motorway, together with park and ride or drop-off areas at most of its stations, serves as the spine of a bus-based rapid transit system for North Shore and Hibiscus Coast citizens. The busway was fully operational between Constellation and Akoranga in February 2008.

A number of North Shore suburbs have a regular ferry service operated by Fullers360 to the Auckland CBD, including Devonport, Stanley Bay, Bayswater, Birkenhead. Others are planned for Takapuna and Browns Bay. A plan in the mid-2000s to turn North Shore streets into a venue for a three-day V8 supercar race generated controversy; traffic experts were hired by the North Shore City Council to assess whether such a race was possible "without causing mayhem on the roads."

Local government

The city was run by a 15-member council (North Shore City Council) and mayor, democratically elected every three years using the First Past The Post voting system. The final mayor prior to 2010 amalgamation was Andrew Williams. The mayor was a strong critic of the 'Super City' proposals which would see North Shore City amalgamated into a larger Auckland authority, Auckland Council. Mayor Williams voiced strong opposition to Transit New Zealand's delays regarding bus lanes. He was a proponent of the $300 million joint busway venture. While the Auckland Regional Council had power to impose property tax rates on suburban areas such as North Shore City, local residents voiced strong opposition. There was a pattern of conflict between local authorities and Auckland city officials regarding many matters, such as transportation, land purchases and decay of wharf facilities. The issue of whether Auckland should be a single city, or a collection of autonomous cities, was a subject of debate in the lead up to amalgamation.

For the purposes of general elections, the city contained three whole electorates, being Northcote, North Shore and East Coast Bays. The electorate of Helensville also takes in portions of the northwest of the city. Politically the city tends to lean to the right: all electorates except Northcote are considered safe National Party seats. Northcote meanwhile is considered a bellwether seat, swinging left and right with the nation as a whole.

Economy
There are over 22,000 businesses located on the North Shore, contributing to over 6% of New Zealand's GDP. The city topped the nation's growth rates for numbers of businesses between 1998 and 2002, growing 29.3%.

The suburb Albany has become the commercial center of the North Shore. A number of retailers like Westfield are building or have built "super stores" in the area, anticipating ongoing commercial growth and expansion. The area has also experienced the construction of intense cheaper housing, and thousands of acres of farmland has been turned into mini-suburbs comprising hundreds of houses all of a similar design. As such, the Albany area has attracted hundreds of millions of investment dollars.

The Royal New Zealand Navy has its main base in Devonport and is a significant employer and industry.

Residential development on the North Shore continues to rapidly sprawl northwards. The Rodney township of Orewa and the Whangaparaoa Peninsula, 25 kilometres north of Takapuna, were once holiday resorts. They are now linked by the Northern Motorway and may eventually be contiguous with the North Shore's northward urban expansion.

Some parts of the North Shore boast some of the most expensive real estate in New Zealand. The stretch of coast that runs north from Takapuna Beach to Milford, often referred to as the "Golden Mile", has many properties there that have sold for several million dollars (NZ$) particularly because of the beaches, Lake Pupuke, popular schools and shopping centres such as Shore City. In 2005, one beachfront property sold for $12.8 million. Rents and property prices on the North Shore are high in relative terms, with average weekly rents (in 2002) of $243 versus $237 for Wellington and $236 for Auckland.

Demographics

In the 2006 New Zealand census, the median income for North Shore residents over 15 years was $29,100, compared with a national average of $24,400.

The racial makeup of the city was 67.5% European, 18.5% Asian, 6.3% Māori, 3.4% Pacific Islander, and 1.8% from the Middle East, Africa or Latin America. Just under 10% gave their ethnicity as "New Zealander", with most of this group having identified itself as European in former Census surveys.

A notable number of South African expatriates have made North Shore their home. Some estimates have them as 10% (or more) of the total population, with most residing in the East Coast Bays.

Television
The North Shore is the onscreen home of New Zealand's most successful soap opera: Shortland Street (It was previously primarily filmed there but still has scenes on the North Shore). Go Girls is another popular show set on the North Shore. Prime TV channel has its studios and based in Albany.

Sports
The North Shore is home to the North Harbour Rugby Union, who field a team in the Mitre 10 Cup. They are based at North Harbour Stadium in Albany. North Shore Rugby Football Club, who play in Devonport, are the oldest rugby union club in the Auckland Region and one of the oldest in New Zealand. The North Shore is also home to North Shore United, founded in 1886, the oldest surviving association football club in New Zealand.

Notable people

 Judy Bailey – retired television newsreader
 Dean Barker – yachtsman
 Robert Berridge – professional boxer
 Stephen Berry – politician and political commentator
 Sir Peter Blake – yachtsman
 Nick Evans – rugby player
 Ian Ferguson – canoeist, Olympic gold medalist
 John Hood – former vice-chancellor of the University of Oxford and University of Auckland
 Rachel Hunter – model and actress
 Ian Jones – rugby union player
 Lorde – singer/songwriter
 Sean Marks – basketball player
 Luke McAlister – rugby union player
 Peter Montgomery – sports broadcaster
 Danny Morrison – cricketer
 Kirk Penney – basketball player
 Winston Reid – footballer
 Frank Sargeson – writer
 Wayne "Buck" Shelford – rugby player
 Pamela Stephenson, Lady Connolly – psychologist, writer, actress, comedian, wife of Billy Connolly
 Bert Sutcliffe – cricketer
 Rosita Vai – New Zealand Idol winner
 Richard Fairgray – author and illustrator

Sister cities
North Shore City was a sister city of:

   Taichung City, Taiwan, 17 December 1996
  Qingdao, People's Republic of China, 9 August 2008

References

External links

 
Geography of Auckland
Populated places established in the 19th century